David Thomas Jones (17 October 1899 – 4 April 1963), also known as Dai Jones, was a British Labour Party politician.

He was elected as Member of Parliament for The Hartlepools at the 1945 general election, and held the seat until his defeat by only 182 votes at the 1959 general election. Left school at 12 after passing Labour examination, started on the railways at 14 and became a signalman. Married Annie Pugh in 1920, 4 children, 2 died in infancy. Member of Pontypridd urban district council for many years also active in trade union affairs (NUR).

References 

British Parliamentary election results: October 1959

External links 
 

1899 births
1963 deaths
Politics of the Borough of Hartlepool
Labour Party (UK) MPs for English constituencies
National Union of Railwaymen-sponsored MPs
UK MPs 1945–1950
UK MPs 1950–1951
UK MPs 1951–1955
UK MPs 1955–1959